Vishwanath (also spelt Viswanath, Vishvanath, Viswanatha) is an Indian surname and given name. It is of Hindu origin and derives from višvanatha, meaning "lord of the universe" (from višva, "universe" + natha, "lord," an epithet of the god Shiva), including the Tamil-Malayalam third-person masculine singular suffix -n, -m. It may refer to:

Films
Justice Viswanathan, 1971 Indian Tamil language film
Kashi Vishwanath, a 2019 Indian film
Lawyer Viswanath, a 1978 Indian film
Vishwanath (1978 film), a Hindi film directed by Subhash Ghai
Vishwanath (1996 film), a Tamil film directed by K. Goutham
Viswanatha Nayakudu, a 1987 Indian Telugu film
Viswanathan Ramamoorthy, 2001 Indian Tamil film
Viswanathan Velai Venum, a 1985 Indian Tamil film

People

Given name
Vishwanath Bhatt (1898 – 1968), Gujarati literary critic and lexicographer
Vishwanath Bhoir, Indian politician
Vishwanath Bondre (1936 – 2014), Indian cricketer
Vishwanath Das Shastri, Indian politician
Vishwanath Datta,  Bengali barrister, philanthropist and novelist
Vishwanath Dev Gajapati (1500 - 1571), a Kalinga king
Vishwanath Jadhav (1885−1964), Indian classical khyal singer
Vishwanath Kashinath Rajwade (1863 – 1926), Indian historian, scholar, writer, commentator
Vishwanath Mahadeshwar (born 1960), Indian politician
Vishwanath Meghwal, Indian politician
Vishvanath Narayan Mandlik (1833 – 1899), Indian legal expert on Hindu law
Viswanatha Nayak, Vijayanagara viceroy to Madurai, during the 16th century
Vishwanath Patil, Indian politician
Vishwanath Prasad Tiwari (born 1940), Indian poet, editor, critic
Vishwanath Pratap Singh (1931–2008), seventh Prime Minister of India
Vishwanath Rao Ringe (born 1922), Hindustani Classical Music vocalist and composer
Vishwanath Reddy Mudnal, Indian politician
Vishwanath Shahdeo (1817 – 1858), king of Barkagarh estate and a rebel in the Indian rebellion of 1857
Vishwanath Sharma, Indian politician
Vishwanath Shastri, Indian politician
Vishwanath Tamasker, Indian politician
Vishwanath Tripathi (born 1931), Indian writer
Vishwanath Vaishampayan (1910 – 1967), Indian revolutionary
Viswanatha Kaviraja, 14th century Indian poet
Viswanatha Sastri, Carnatic music composer
Viswanatha Satyanarayana, (1895 – 1976), an Indian Telugu writer
Viswanathan Anand, (born 1969) Indian chess grandmaster and former world chess champion
Viswanathan Kumaran, Indian chemical engineer and rheologist
Viswanathan Manikan (born 1951), Indian activist
Viswanathan Raghunathan (born 1954), Indian academic, author, columnist
Viswanathan Ratnam, Indian Judge
Viswanathan–Ramamoorthy, Indian music-director duo
Viswanathan Ravichandran, Indian film producer and distributor

Surname
Adagur H. Vishwanath (born 1949), Indian politician
Acharya Vishwanath Baitha, Indian politician
Ashoke Viswanathan, Indian Bengali filmmaker
Ashvin Vishwanath, (born 1973), Indian-American theoretical physicist
A. K. Viswanathan, Indian Police Service officer
Cheri Viswanath (1933 – 2014), South indian screenwriter, playwright, lyricist and journalist
Chitra Vishwanath, an Indian architect
Balaji Vishwanath (1680–1719), Peshwas (Prime Minister) of the Maratha empire
Balasubramanian Viswanathan, Indian material scientist
Bhaskar Vishwananth Ghokale (1903 – 1962), Indian Ayurveda practitioner
Biju Viswanath, Malayalam film and photography director

Dhirajlal Mahashankar Vishwanath Thaker (1897–1947), British colonial official and Paymaster General of the Port of Karachi
G. Viswanathan,  founder and chancellor of Vellore Institute of Technology, India
Geraldine Viswanathan, (born 1995), Australian actress
Gitl Schaechter-Viswanath, Yiddish-language poet and author
Gundappa Viswanath (born 1949), Indian cricketer
Hari Viswanath, Indian film director, producer and screenwriter
Harish Viswanathan, Indian scientist
Indira Viswanathan Peterson, Indian literary critic
Janaki Vishwanathan, Indian film maker
K. A. P. Viswanatham (1899 – 1994), Indian scholar, orator and social activist

Kethu Viswanatha Reddy, Indian short story writer
K. Viswanath (born 1930), Telugu film director
Kaithapram Vishwanathan Namboothiri, Indian musician and music director
Kalpana Viswanath, Indian social entrepreneur
Kanithi Viswanatham, Indian politician
Kasisomayajula Viswanath, American scientist
K. K. Viswanathan (1914 – 1992), Indian ex-governor of Gujrat
Maharajapuram Viswanatha Iyer, Indian Carnatic vocalist
Maharajapuram Viswanatha Santhanam (1928 - 1992), Carnatic music vocalist
Mahashankar Vishwanath Thaker (1867 – 1902), Chief Treasurer of the Princely State of Limbdi under Jhala Rajput rule
Mavila Vishwanathan Nair (born 1952), Chairman of the Credit Information Bureau of India Limited
Mohanlal Viswanathan Nair (born 1960), Indian actor
M. S. Viswanathan (1928-2015), Tamil film music composer
N. Viswanathan, Indian actor and academic
N. K. Viswanathan, Indian film director and cinematographer
N. S. Vishwanathan, deputy governor of Reserve Bank of India
Nikil Viswanathan, American entrepreneur
P. Viswanathan, Indian politician
P. H. Vishwanath, Indian film director, writer and a producer who works in Kannada cinema
Padma Viswanathan, Canadian playwright
Palghat Kollengode Viswanatha Narayanaswamy, Indian musician 
Paranjape Prakash Vishvanath (1947–2008), Indian politician
Paris Viswanathan (born 1940), Indian painter and filmmaker
Pramod Viswanath, Indian professor 
Pranjivan Vishwanath Thaker (1860 - 1920), Diwan of Saurashtra, Gujarat
Premi Viswanath,  Indian television actress
Penumarti Viswanatha Sastry, (1929 – 1998), Indian Telugu writer and editor
R Viswanathan, Indian diplomat
R. Ranchandra Vishwanath Wardekar (1913-1996), Indian doctor and founder of Gandhi Memorial Leprosy Foundation
R. Viswanathan, Indian politician 
Rachakonda Viswanatha Sastry (1922–1993), Indian Telugu writer
Radha Viswanathan, Indian vocalist and classical dancer
Ramakrishnan Vishwanathan (1960–1999), Indian Army officer
Raman Viswanathan, Indian physician
Ramesh Vishwanath Katti (born 1964), Indian politician
Ramnarayan Vishwanath Pathak, Indian poet and writer
S. R. Vishwanath (born 1962), Indian politician
Sadanand Vishwanath (born 1962), former Indian cricketer
Sanju Viswanath (1994), Indian cricketer
Shivraj Vishwanath Patil, Indian politician
Sunny Viswanath, Indian composer and music producer
T. Viswanathan (1927–2002), Indian Carnatic music flutist
T. K. Viswanathan, Indian politician
T. N. Viswanatha Reddy, Indian politician
T. R. Viswanathan, American engineer
Umesh Vishwanath Katti, Indian politician
V. Viswanatha Menon (1927 - 2019), Indian Communist leader
V. Viswanathan (1909 - 1987) Indian ICS officer
Vani Viswanath (born 1968), Indian actress
Vichu Vishwanath, Indian film and television actor
Vishwa Nath Sharma (born 1930), 15th Chief of the Indian Army Staff
Vysyaraju Kasi Viswanadham Raju, Indian politician
Y. Kasi Viswanath, Indian actor and director

Temples

 Kashi Vishwanath Temple, Uttar Pradesh, India
 Kasi Viswanathar temple, Tenkasi, Tamil Nadu, India
 Kasi Viswanathar temple, Sivakasi, Tamil Nadu, India
 Kasi Viswanathar Temple, Kumbakonam, Tamil Nadu, India
 Kasi Viswanathar Temple, Umayalpuram, Tamil Nadu, India
 Kasi Viswanatha Temple, Ayanavaram, Tamil Nadu, India
 Kasi Viswanatha Temple, West Mambalam, Tamil Nadu, India
 Kunnuvarankottai Kasi Visalakshi-Viswanathar Temple, Tamil Nadu, India
 Shri Vishwanath Mandir, Uttar Pradesh, India
 Sri Kasi Vishwanatha Temple Flint, Hindu temple in Michigan, USA

See also
A. R. C. Viswanathan College, in India
K.A.P. Viswanatham Government Medical College, in India
Dr. Vishwanath Karad MIT World Peace University, Indian university in Pune, Maharastra
Kashi Vishwanath Express, an Indian express train
Viswanath Charali railway station, Indian railway station
Vishwanathganj, Indian town in Uttar Pradesh
Viswanath's constant, a mathematical constant
Viswanatha chikitsa, text written by physician Viswanatha Sen in 1921
Viswanatham, Indian town in Tamil Nadu

Indian surnames
Indian given names
Tamil masculine given names